The Fury is a 1978 American supernatural thriller film directed by Brian De Palma and starring Kirk Douglas, John Cassavetes, Amy Irving, Carrie Snodgress, Charles Durning, and Andrew Stevens. The screenplay by John Farris was based on his 1976 novel of the same name.

Produced by Frank Yablans and released by 20th Century Fox on March 10, 1978, the film was both critically and commercially successful, grossing $24 million from a $7.5 million budget. Film critic Pauline Kael highly lauded the music, composed and conducted by John Williams, calling it "as apt and delicately varied a score as any horror movie has ever had".

Plot 
In Israel, ex-CIA agent Peter Sandza and his psychic son Robin meet Ben Childress, Peter's old agency colleague. Sandza plans to leave his old life and return to the United States with his son, but Childress objects and subsequently stages a terrorist attack to cover up kidnapping Robin for his “protection”. Peter narrowly survives, maiming Childress in the attempt and escaping while heavily injured, but is unable to protect Robin.

Months later in Chicago, high-school student Gillian Bellaver discovers her psychic powers, including telekinesis and extra-sensory perception, during an in-class demonstration. The uncontrolled manifestations of these powers harm people who physically touch or provoke her. She volunteers to attend the Paragon Institute, a live-in research facility studying psychic powers in adolescents.

Meanwhile, Peter has tracked his son to Chicago. After evading Childress's agents, Peter meets with his girlfriend Hester, a Paragon nurse, who tells him about Gillian. Peter tells Gillian that Paragon's director is cooperating with PSI, a covert agency led by Childress that kidnaps psychic children to weaponize their powers for the American government, managing and controlling the psychics by brainwashing them and eliminating their families.

As Gillian's psychic prowess grows, she begins experiencing visions of the Institute abusing Robin, who has unsuccessfully attempted escape, and eventually connects to him telepathically. Knowing that she knows too much and that her powers are growing, Childress orders that Gillian be transported to PSI headquarters where Robin is being kept. Hester overhears Childress's conversation and informs Peter, who plans a rescue, hoping she can lead him to Robin.

The rescue is successful, but Hester is killed in the process. Gillian uses her powers to assist Peter in tracking Robin down to a remote mansion in the countryside, where Childress and his handler Susan have spent the last several months grooming and experimenting on him. Though Robin's abilities have grown to unprecedented levels, he gradually becomes increasingly unstable from the psychological strain of his superiors' machinations, culminating in a mass murder inside Old Chicago, an indoor amusement park.

As Peter and Gillian infiltrate the mansion, Robin senses her presence. Believing that PSI intends to kill him and replace him with another psychic, he finally snaps, telekinetically torturing and killing Susan. Peter confronts his son, but Robin, a now-schizoid, furiously attacks him. Robin is thrown out of the window and scratches Peter when he tries to save him from falling. When Robin plunges to the ground, a distraught Peter flings himself after his son, thus killing himself.

Robin lingers a bit before finally dying, and seems to make some form of psychic contact with Gillian; he transfers his refined powers to her, implying that she will save herself from Childress and avenge his death. The next morning, Childress approaches Gillian and starts manipulating her to get her to connect with him. Understanding his long-term intentions, she embraces her psychic abilities and avenges the deaths of Robin and Peter by causing Childress's body to explode.

Cast 

Actress Hilary Thompson (Cheryl) had her dialogue redubbed by an uncredited Betty Buckley.

Production
In an interview with The Talks, De Palma said that he had 8 or 9 high-speed cameras to film Cassavetes exploding in the film's conclusion: "The first time we did it, it didn't work. The body parts didn't go towards the right cameras and this whole set was covered with blood. And it took us almost a week to get back to do take two".

Reception
Roger Ebert of the Chicago Sun-Times gave the film three stars out of four and called it "a stylish entertainment, fast-paced, and acted with great energy. I'm not quite sure it makes a lot of sense, but that's the sort of criticism you only make after it's over. During the movie, too much else is happening". Arthur D. Murphy of Variety stated that "the film plays very well to an undemanding escapist audience", but "those who have to write about the film are confronted with a gaping hole in the script: Apart from a few throwaway references to government agencies and psychic phenomena, there is never, anywhere, a coherent exposition of what all the running and jumping is about. The more one analyzes the picture, the less substantive its story becomes. Better not to think too much about this one". 

Vincent Canby of The New York Times wrote: "'The Fury' is bigger than Carrie, more elaborate, much more expensive and far sillier ... It's also, in fits and starts, the kind of mindless fun that only a horror movie that so seriously pretends to be about the mind can be. Mr. De Palma seems to have been less interested in the overall movie than in pulling off a couple of spectacular set-pieces, which he does". 

Gene Siskel of the Chicago Tribune gave the film one-and-a-half stars out of four and described it as "one of those thrillers where you sit around and wait for the big scenes. And the key word in that sentence is 'wait' because there is little in The Fury to hold your attention in between its three big scenes of extreme violence. That's because the film develops only one character. Its story also makes little sense, and for a movie ostensibly about psychic powers, The Fury contains precious little magic". 

Kevin Thomas of the Los Angeles Times wrote that "at any moment The Fury could lapse into the ludicrous, but De Palma's control is so taut and filled with bravura that he makes plausible the most bizarre—and bloody—psychic manifestations, not to mention much physical derring-do. Without indulging in the gratuitous, lingering displays that lead to morbidity, De Palma keeps you at seat's edge. He seems to be able to get away with everything".

Judith Martin of The Washington Post called it a "very slick movie" and "a film for people who like to see blood — lots of blood, blood pouring from unpleasantly unlikely places, such as eyeballs — and not for anyone who doesn't". 

Pauline Kael of The New Yorker wrote that "De Palma is one of the few directors in the sound era to make a horror film that is so visually compelling that a viewer seems to have entered a mythic night world. Inside that world, transfixed, we can hear the faint, distant sound of De Palma cackling with pleasure". The music, composed and conducted by John Williams and performed by the London Symphony Orchestra for the LP re-recording, was also highly praised by Kael, who wrote that it "may be as apt and delicately varied a score as any horror movie has ever had".

As of August 2021, the film holds a 77% approval rating on Rotten Tomatoes from 30 reviews. The site's consensus reads: "Brian De Palma reins in his stylistic flamboyance to eerie effect in The Fury, a telekinetic slow burn that rewards patient viewers with its startling set-pieces".

The film opened in 484 theatres in the United States and Canada and grossed $1,917,075. The following weekend it expanded to 518 theatres and
grossed $2,777,291 which placed it at number one at the box office for the week.

Accolades
Rick Baker and William J. Tuttle both won Best Make-up at the 6th Saturn Awards.

Home media
In October 2013, UK video label Arrow Films released The Fury onto Blu-ray with a brand-new transfer and exclusive extras.

References

External links 
 
 
 
 
 
 The Carolyn Jackson Collection, no. 30 – interview with Brian De Palma at the Texas Archive of the Moving Image

The Fury
1978 films
1978 horror films
1970s English-language films
1970s horror thriller films
1970s psychological horror films
1970s psychological thriller films
1970s science fiction horror films
1970s science fiction thriller films
1970s supernatural horror films
20th Century Fox films
American horror thriller films
American psychological horror films
American psychological thriller films
American science fiction horror films
American science fiction thriller films
American supernatural horror films
American supernatural thriller films
Films about telekinesis
Films based on American horror novels
Films directed by Brian De Palma
Films scored by John Williams
Films set in Chicago
Films set in country houses
Films shot in Chicago
Films shot in Illinois
Films shot in Israel
1970s American films